Selkirkia is a genus of predatory, tubicolous priapulid worms known from the Middle Cambrian Burgess Shale, Ogygopsis Shale and Puncoviscana Formation. 142 specimens of Selkirkia are known from the Greater Phyllopod bed, where they comprise 0.27% of the community. In the Burgess Shale, 20% of the tapering, organic-walled tubes are preserved with the worm inside them, whereas the other 80% are empty (or sometimes occupied by one or more small agnostid trilobites).  Whilst alive, the tubes were probably vertical, whereas trilobite-occupied tubes are horizontal.

Morphology 
Selkirkia had a body divisible into a proboscis towards the anterior of a trunk enclosed by a tube. The proboscis would have been partially invertable and was armed with several spinules and spines, decreasing size distally overall. It was controlled by at least two sets of anterior retractor muscles. Immediately behind the proboscis was the trunk, smooth for the most part but lined with papillae towards the anterior. Surrounding the trunk was the tube, which way very finely annulated (4 annulations per 0.1 millimeters).

History 
Members Cambrorhytium were originally described as Selkirkia before their identification as a separate genus.

References

External links 
 

Burgess Shale fossils
Prehistoric protostome genera
Priapulida
Wheeler Shale

Cambrian genus extinctions